The 2003–04 Divizia D was the 62nd season of the Liga IV, the fourth tier of the Romanian football league system. The champions of each county association promoted to Divizia C without promotion play-off.

County leagues

Arad County

Bihor County

Covasna County

Dâmbovița County

Galați County

Harghita County

Mureș County 

Championship play-off

Neamț County

See also 
 2003–04 Divizia A
 2003–04 Divizia B

References

External links
 FRF

Liga IV seasons
4
Romania